Anaptomorphinae is a pre-historic group of primates known from Eocene fossils in North America and Europe and later periods of Paleocene Asia, and are a sub-family of omomyids. The anaptomorphines is a paraphyletic group consisting of the two tribes Trogolemurini and Anaptomorphini.
Anaptomorphine radiation in Wyoming, one of the most detailed records of changes within populations and between species in the fossil record, has provided remarkable evidence of transitional fossils.

Description

Teilhardina is the most primitive of the anaptomorphines with respect a number of dental features (e.g. four premolars and relatively unreduced canine). Most scientists recognize at least fourteen genera of anaptomorphine. The probable lineages of Tetonius, Absarokius and Anemorhysis evolved from Teilhardinia or a closely related form from North America.

Tetonius and Shoshonius have been classified as belonging to the Tarsiiformes, and are therefore not closely related to human ancestors. The Anaptomorphine population was apparently high during the Early Tertiary. Tetonius from the Early Eocene was first found in the late nineteenth century and is considered important due to the significance of the find in forming the phylogeny of the primates. The last known animal belonging to the group was Trogolemur.

Analyses of over a hundred specimens of omomyid primates recovered in the Wasatch formation in Wyoming, suggest that anaptomorphines never developed the highly specialised molars seen in modern prosimians. Similarly, incisor enlargement was most likely an adaptation for grooming and food manipulation rather than a purely frugivorous or insectivorous diet.

Classification
 Subfamily †Anaptomorphinae Cope, 1883
 †Trogolemurini
 †Trogolemur Matthew, 1909
 †Walshina López-Torres, Silcox, and Holroyd, 2018
 †Sphacorhysis Gunnell, 1995
 †Anaptomorphini Cope, 1883
 †Arapahovius Savage & Waters, 1978
 †Bownomomys Morse et al, 2018
 †Tatmanius Bown & Rose, 1991
 †Teilhardina Simpson, 1940
 †Anemorhysis Gazin, 1958
 †Chlororhysis Gazin, 1958
 †Tetonius Matthew, 1915
 †Pseudotetonius Bown, 1974
 †Absarokius Matthew, 1915
 †Anaptomorphus Cope, 1872
 †Aycrossia Bown, 1979
 †Strigorhysis Bown, 1979
 †Mckennamorphus Szalay, 1976
 †Gazinius Bown, 1979

Notes

References

 
 
 
 
 
 
 
 

Prehistoric primates
Mammal subfamilies
Paleocene first appearances
Eocene extinctions
Taxa named by Edward Drinker Cope
Taxa described in 1883